Henry Beauchamp, 14th Earl and Duke of Warwick (22 March 142511 June 1446) was an English nobleman.

Life
Henry was the son of Richard Beauchamp, 13th Earl of Warwick, and Isabel le Despenser. In 1434, he married Cecily Neville, the eldest daughter of Richard Neville, 5th Earl of Salisbury, and Alice Montagu, Countess of Salisbury. He became 14th Earl of Warwick on his father's death in 1439.

His boyhood friendship with King Henry VI and his father's military services placed him high in the King's favour, and he was loaded with titles. In 1444, he was made premier Earl of the realm, and on 14 April 1445, was created Duke of Warwick, and around the same time, granted the Forest of Feckenham.

He is said to have been crowned King of the Isle of Wight in 1444 by Henry VI, to place his playmate on a more equal standing with him, but this story is considered unhistorical.

As Duke of Warwick, he was preceded only by the Duke of Norfolk. This precedence was disputed by the Duke of Buckingham, whom it displaced. However, the issue was rendered moot by his death on 11 June 1446, at which time the dukedom expired for lack of heirs-male.

Succession

On his death, the earldom was inherited by his two-year-old daughter, Anne (14 February 14443 June 1449), suo jure Countess of Warwick. She, however, died three years later, and there was some question regarding who, if any, of her father's sisters (or their heirs) should succeed. 

In the end, his full sister Anne (who was married to Richard Neville, eldest son of Richard Neville, Earl of Salisbury, and brother to Beauchamp's widow) was declared the heir, due to the English common law principle that "possession by the brother makes the sister the heir", which denies relatives of the half-blood from inheriting when full-blood relatives are available to inherit. The three half-sisters from their father's first marriage contested this decision, but to no avail.

Ancestry

References 

 
 

1425 births
1446 deaths
15th-century English nobility
Beauchamp
Dukes in the Peerage of England
Henry
Burials at Tewkesbury Abbey
Lords of Glamorgan
Barons Burghersh